Rajput or Rajputana are divided in number of clans (Gotras).They have as many as 1178 gotras.

A 

 Aswal

P 

 Panwar
 Parmar

S 

 Sisodia

R 

 Rawat

References 

Rajput clans
Gotras